MDMA (also known as Cardinal X or Angie X) is a 2017 American crime drama film written and directed by Angie Wang, and produced by Wang and Fire Horse Film Productions LLC in association with Blue Creek Pictures. The film is about a young woman, Angie Wang (played by Annie Q.), who becomes the biggest supplier of MDMA on the West Coast of the United States in the mid-1980s. According to the film's official website, it is "inspired by true events" from Wang's own life.

The film had its world premiere at CAAMFest on March 10, 2017. It was released in the United States in select theaters and through digital and on demand services on September 14, 2018, by Shout! Factory.

Plot
Angie is in college, but finding the money is hard for her family. Her father tells her to change college to save money, and she decides to earn some money herself. While partying with friends, she is introduced to MDMA.

She realizes that MDMA is unregulated, and so neither legal nor illegal. After researching the papers published by the developing teams, she formulates her own method and starts production. She works hard both in and after school, and parties, where she also sells her own product, all while keeping the supply anonymous.

Cast
 Annie Q. as Angie
 Francesca Eastwood as Jeanine
 Pierson Fodé as Alex
 Elisa Donovan as Mary
 Ron Yuan as Michael
 Yetide Badaki as Anita
 Aalyrah Caldwell as Bree
 Scott Keiji Takeda as Tommy
 Henry Zaga as Donnie

Production
The film is based on Wang's personal life and experiences as it was, according to the Blue Creek Pictures website, "inspired by true events of Wang's gritty past as one of the major players in the party-drug business."

Reception
On Rotten Tomatoes, the film has an approval rating of 53% based on 17 reviews, with an average rating of 6.12/10.

Sheri Linden of the "Hollywood Reporter" wrote: "It's Wang's eye for social realities, brought to life by her cast, that gives her film its edge."
Film Threat gave it a rave, Bradley Gibson stating "This is a fantastic film. Imagine any John Hughes film as a drug-fueled drama." 
Kimber Myers of the Los Angeles Times said that the film "falls short of feeling ecstatic", and that "Wang could have used some distance from the material." She also felt the film fell short of its potential, with Wang being too involved as "the film’s sole director, writer and subject", and that she used unnecessary sub-plot to "cast her on-screen counterpart in a better light".

References

2017 crime drama films
2017 independent films
2017 films
American crime drama films
American films based on actual events
American independent films
Crime films based on actual events
Drama films based on actual events
Films about the illegal drug trade
Films set in 1984
Films shot in San Francisco
2010s English-language films
2010s American films